Raj Kumar Singh (born 20 December 1952) is a former Indian bureaucrat and a current Union Cabinet Minister in the Government of India. He is a Member of the Indian Parliament  for Arrah, Bihar, since May 2014.  Singh is a 1975 batch Bihar cadre Indian Administrative Service officer and former Home Secretary of India.

On 3 September 2017, he was appointed as the Minister of Power (Independent Charge) in Prime Minister Narendra Modi's cabinet. On 30 May 2019, he was appointed as Minister of State (Independent Charge) of the Ministry of Power, Minister of State (Independent Charge) of the Ministry of New and Renewable Energy and Minister of State in the Ministry of Skill Development and Entrepreneurship, Government of India.

On 7th July 2021, He was elevated to the rank of Cabinet minister.

Personal life
Singh was born to Haldhar Prasad Singh and Chandrakala Devi in Supaul in a Gandhavariya Rajput Family in Bihar. He gained  a Bachelor of Arts (Hons.) degree in English Literature, a LL.B. and a Diploma in Management. He was educated at St. Stephen's College, Delhi, Magadh University and Delft University of Technology, Netherlands. He married Shiela Singh on 27 February 1975. They have a son and a daughter together.

Bureaucrat career
He was the district magistrate in East Champaran and Patna in the 1980s before joining the state home department in 1997.

On 30 October 1990, R.K. Singh, who was then posted as Registrar Cooperatives, Govt. of Bihar in Patna, was asked to arrest Advani in Samastipur, while Advani's Ram Rath Yatra was en route to Ayodhya in Uttar Pradesh from Somnath in Gujarat. For this Mr. Singh was empowered through a special order by the then Chief Minister Lalu Prasad Yadav and sent on deputation to Samastipur as Additional Magistrate. The arrest was made by order of the Lalu Prasad Yadav government. The complete operation was so secret that even the then DM and SP of Samastipur were not aware about the arrest plan.

During the Nitish Kumar government's first term (2004–2009), Singh, as principal secretary in the road construction department, played an important role in improving the condition of roads in Bihar. In the National Democratic Alliance-led government, the then Home Minister, Advani, selected Singh to work as joint secretary in the Home Ministry for five years from 1999 to 2004. R.K. Singh was Union Home Secretary of India from 30 June 2011 to 30 June 2013, after that he retired from service. In 2013, Singh was tipped to be adviser (infrastructure) in the Nitish Kumar-led Bihar government, a post created through cabinet approval. However, he did not accept the assignment.

Before his appointment as Union home Secretary, Union Defence Minister A. K. Antony had picked Singh to head the department of defence production in 2009 in view of his clean reputation. Singh was chosen by the then Union Home Minister P. Chidambaram for his efficiency and no-nonsense attitude. Known to be a tough taskmaster, Chidambaram got along well with Singh at a professional level. However, Singh had several run-ins with Chidambaram's successor, Sushilkumar Shinde, who was not happy with the home secretary's handling of the situation following 16 December 2012 Delhi gang rape.

It was during the tenure of R.K. Singh as the Union home secretary that 26/11 Mumbai attack terrorist Ajmal Kasab and Parliament attack case convict Afzal Guru were hanged.

R.K. Singh after retirement also revealed Shinde's involvement in the IPL Spot-fixing case and how Shinde had interfered in that investigation. Shinde also met the accused Shahid Balwa at his North Block office even after R.K. Singh's statements regarding Shinde's involvement in the IPL spot-fixing case.

Political career 

There was speculation that Singh would contest from the Bihar constituencies of either Arrah or Supaul in the 2014 Lok Sabha polls, though Rashtriya Swayamsevak Sangh objected to him contesting from Supaul.  On 13 December 2013, Singh joined the BJP. He contested the election as a BJP candidate in Arrah, beating his nearest rival, Sribhagwan Singh Kushwaha of RJD by a margin of over 1,35,000 votes.

In the 2019 General Elections conducted for the formation of the 17th Lok Sabha, he again contested from Arrah and retained his seat becoming the first MP from Arrah since Chandradeo Prasad Verma to retain his seat in successive elections. He defeated his nearest rival Raju Yadav of CPI (ML) Liberation by 1,47,285 votes.

On 3 September 2017, Mr. Singh was appointed as Minister of Power (Independent Charge) and Minister of New and Renewable Energy (Independent Charge) by Narendra Modi. This post was previously held by Piyush Goyal.

In May 2019, Singh was appointed as Minister of State (Independent Charge) for Power and New and Renewable Energy and Minister of State for Skill Development and Entrepreneurship.

References

External links
 Bihar Breakthrough - RK Singh

|-

|-

|-

Bihar cadre civil servants
Indian Administrative Service officers
People from Bihar
Bharatiya Janata Party politicians from Bihar
People from Supaul district
1953 births
Living people
India MPs 2014–2019
People from Arrah
India MPs 2019–present
Narendra Modi ministry
Ministers of Power of India